Rotelli is an Italian surname. Notable people with the surname include:

Chris Rotelli (born 1979), American professional lacrosse player
Luigi Rotelli (1833–1891), Italian cardinal

See also
Rotelle
Rotello (surname)

Italian-language surnames